Atelura formicaria is a species of nicoletiid in the family Nicoletiidae.

References

Further reading

 

Insects
Articles created by Qbugbot
Insects described in 1855